William William Van Wyck (August 9, 1777 – August 27, 1840) was an American politician from New York.

Life
Born near Fishkill, New York, Van Wyck attended the public schools and Fishkill Academy.
He engaged in agricultural pursuits.

Van Wyck was elected as a Democratic-Republican to the 17th and 18th United States Congresses, holding office from December 3, 1821, to March 3, 1825. He was Chairman of the Committee on Expenditures in the Post Office Department (18th Congress).

He removed to Sudley, Virginia, and engaged in planting. He returned to Dutchess County, New York, and died in Fishkill. He was buried at the Dutch Reformed Churchyard.

References

1777 births
1840 deaths
American people of Dutch descent
People from Fishkill, New York
People from Prince William County, Virginia
Democratic-Republican Party members of the United States House of Representatives from New York (state)
Van Wyck family